Cabo Verde is the sixth album by Cesária Évora.

The last single is based on a poem "Quem ca conchê Mindelo, Ca conché Cabo-Verde" by Manuel de Novas, it would be titled "Ess Pais" (Portuguese: "Este Pais")

Track listing 
 "Tchintchirote"
 "Sabine Larga'm" (Sabino, leave me)
 "Partida" (Departure)
 "Sangue de Beirona" (Beirona's blood)
 "Apocalipse"
 "Mar Ê Morada de Sodade" (The sea is the home of Nostalgia)
 "Bo Ê Di Meu Cretcheu" (You are mine, beloved)
 "Coragem Irmon" (Take courage, brother)
 "Quem Bô Ê" (Who are you?)
 "Regresso" (Return)
 "Zebra"
 "Mae Velha" (Old mother)
 "Pe Di Boi" (Quarrel)
 "Ess Pais" (This country)

Charts

Certifications

References

External links

1997 albums
Cesária Évora albums